Sulfisomidine (INN), also known as sulphasomidine (BAN until 2003), sulfamethin and sulfaisodimidine, is a sulfonamide antibacterial. It is closely related to sulfadimidine.

References

External links
 

Sulfonamide antibiotics
Pyrimidines